Manolis A. Triantafyllidis (Athens, 15 November 1883 – Athens, 20 April 1959) was a major representative of the demotic movement in education in Greece. 

He was mostly active in Thessaloniki, at the Aristotle University of Thessaloniki. He is well known for his comprehensive grammar of Modern Greek. 

There is an institute named after him at the University of Thessaloniki (the Manolis Triantafyllidis Foundation, also known as the Institute of Modern Greek Studies), under whose auspices the Triantafyllidis Dictionary (formally, Dictionary of Common Modern Greek [Λεξικό της κοινής νεοελληνικής], 1998) was published.

References
 "Triantafyllidis, Manolis A., 1883-1959" at E.KE.BI / Biblionet

Modern Greek language
Greek educators
1959 deaths
1883 births
Writers from Athens
Academic staff of the Aristotle University of Thessaloniki
Greek people from the Ottoman Empire